Pier-Olivier Côté (born May 30, 1984) is a Canadian professional boxer. Cote was born in Cali, Colombia, but at 18-months-old was adopted by Réjean Côté and Christiane Pleau (his parents) of Charlesbourg Quebec and grew up in the Quebec City suburb.

Professional career

Super Lightweight
Côté needed only two minutes and fifty seconds to send Michael Lozada to the canvas three times and win his fight at the Bell Centre on March 19, 2011. He was the co-feature of Lucian Bute's defence of his IBF Super-middleweight title against Brian Magee of Ireland.

On Feb 27, 2010 Cote made his U.S debut when took on Willshaun Boxley in Augusta, Georgia. On May 7, 2011 Cote made his second U.S debut when took on Aris Ambriz in the opening bout of the Showtime coverage of the Manny Pacquiao vs. Shane Mosley event. Cote dominated Ambriz on all rounds. Cote wasn't able to finish the fight in round three but as Cote continued to land in the fourth it led to Weeks jumping in and calling a halt to the bout. 

His next scheduled fight was postponed due to illness.  He has been inactive since.

Professional boxing record

| style="text-align:center;" colspan="8"|19 Wins(13 knockouts, 6 decisions), 0 Losses, 0 Draw(s)
|-  style="text-align:center; background:#e3e3e3;"
|  style="border-style:none none solid solid; "|Res.
|  style="border-style:none none solid solid; "|Record
|  style="border-style:none none solid solid; "|Opponent
|  style="border-style:none none solid solid; "|Type
|  style="border-style:none none solid solid; "|Rd., Time
|  style="border-style:none none solid solid; "|Date
|  style="border-style:none none solid solid; "|Location
|  style="border-style:none none solid solid; "|Notes
|- align=center
|Win
|align=center|19–0 ||align=left| Mark Lloyd
|
|
|
|align=left|
|align=left|
|- align=center
|Win
|align=center|18–0 ||align=left| Jorge Teron
|
|
|
|align=left|
|align=left|
|- align=center
|Win
|align=center|17–0||align=left| Pedro Navarrete
|
|
|
|align=left|
|align=left|
|- align=center
|Win
|align=center|16–0||align=left| Aris Ambríz
|
|
|
|align=left|
|align=left|
|- align=center
|Win
|align=center|15–0||align=left| Michael Lozada
|
|
|
|align=left|
|align=left|
|- align=center
|Win
|align=center|14–0||align=left| Cesar Soriano
|
|
|
|align=left|
|align=left|
|- align=center
|Win
|align=center|13–0||align=left| Walter Sergio Gomez
|
|
|
|align=left|
|align=left|
|- align=center
|Win
|align=center|12–0||align=left| Hugo Armenta
|
|
|
|align=left|
|align=left|
|- align=center
|Win
|align=center|11–0||align=left| Hugo Pacheco
|
|
|
|align=left|
|align=left|
|- align=center
|Win
|align=center|10–0||align=left| Willshaun Boxley
|
|
|
|align=left|
|align=left|
|- align=center
|Win
|align=center|9–0||align=left| Jason Hayward
|
|
|
|align=left|
|align=left|
|- align=center
|Win
|align=center|8–0||align=left| Leonardo Rojas
|
|
|
|align=left|
|align=left|
|- align=center
|Win
|align=center|7–0||align=left| Jean Charlemagne
|
|
|
|align=left|
|align=left|
|- align=center
|Win
|align=center|6–0||align=left| Luis Acevedo
|
|
|
|align=left|
|align=left|
|- align=center
|Win
|align=center|5–0||align=left| Jesus Gutierrez
|
|
|
|align=left|
|align=left|
|- align=center
|Win
|align=center|4–0||align=left| Ramon Elizer Esperanza
|
|
|
|align=left|
|align=left|
|- align=center
|Win
|align=center|3–0||align=left| Juan Carlos Pastrana
|
|
|
|align=left|
|align=left|
|- align=center
|Win
|align=center|2–0||align=left| Damian Tinker
|
|
|
|align=left|
|align=left|
|- align=center
|Win
|align=center|1–0||align=left| Martin Huppe
|
|
|
|align=left|
|align=left|
|- align=center

Titles in boxing

Minor Sanctioning Bodies:
IBF Inter-Continental Light Welterweight World Champion (140 lbs)
Canada Super Featherweight National Champion (130 lbs)

Notes

External links
 
Fight of Pier-Olivier Cote VS Cesar Soriano
Fight of Pier-Olivier Cote against Michael Lozada
Fight of Pier-Olivier Cote against Jorge Luis Teron

Light-welterweight boxers
1984 births
Living people
People from Cali
Sportspeople from Quebec City
Canadian male boxers